Linline Matauatu (born 23 March 1991) is a Vanuatuan beach volleyball player.

Matauatu competed at the 2018 Commonwealth Games where she won a bronze medal in the women's tournament alongside Miller Pata.

She was named as the most improved player at the 2015 FIVB World Tour.

References

1991 births
Living people
Vanuatuan female beach volleyball players
Beach volleyball players at the 2018 Commonwealth Games
Commonwealth Games bronze medallists for Vanuatu